Copa América songs and anthems are songs and tunes adopted officially to be used as warm-ups to the event, to accompany the championships during the event and as a souvenir reminder of the events as well as for advertising campaigns leading for the Copa América, giving the singers exceptional universal world coverage and notoriety.

Official songs and anthems

Entrance music

See also
 List of FIFA World Cup songs and anthems
 List of UEFA European Championship songs and anthems
 List of Africa Cup of Nations songs and anthems
 List of AFC Asian Cup songs and anthems

References